Raban Adelmann (September 9, 1912 – September 18, 1992) was a German politician of the Christian Democratic Union (CDU) and former member of the German Bundestag.

Life 
Adelmann was a member of the German Bundestag from 1957 to 1961. As a member of the CDU, he represented the constituency of Ludwigsburg in parliament.

Literature

References

1912 births
1992 deaths
Members of the Bundestag for Baden-Württemberg
Members of the Bundestag 1957–1961
Members of the Bundestag for the Christian Democratic Union of Germany